This is a list of Russian football transfers in the summer transfer window 2010 by club. Only transfers of the 2010 Russian Premier League are included.

Russian Premier League 2010

Alania Vladikavkaz

In:

Out:

Amkar Perm

In:

Out:

Anzhi Makhachkala

In:

Out:

CSKA Moscow

In:

Out:

Dynamo Moscow

In:

Out:

Krylia Sovetov Samara

In:

Out:

Lokomotiv Moscow

In:

Out:

FC Rostov

In:

Out:

Rubin Kazan

In:

Out:

Saturn Moscow Oblast

In:

Out:

Sibir Novosibirsk

In:

Out:

Spartak Moscow

In:

Out:

Spartak Nalchik

In:

Out:

Terek Grozny

In:

Out:

Tom Tomsk

In:

Out:

Zenit Saint Petersburg

In:

Out:

References

Transfers
2010
Russia